Ghazal (ഗസൽ) is a 1993 Malayalam film directed by Kamal. Vineeth and Mohini play the lead roles in the film and Thilakan appears in a supporting role. Director Kamal considers the film close to his heart, a film that took him to childhood memories.

Cast

Vineeth as Muneer
Mohini as Sereena
Nassar as Valiyamaliyekkal Syed Burhanudeen Thangal
Thilakan as Thangal Uppappa
Srividya as wife of Burhanudeen Thangal
Nedumudi Venu as Alikkutty
Manoj K. Jayan as Khadar
Sreenivasan as Beeran
Santha Devi as Kondotty Ammayi
Sonia
Zeenath as Amina, mother of Khadar
Mamukkoya as Mollakka
Kuthiravattam Pappu as Ossan
Jose Pellissery as Muzeebath/ Valiyamaliyekkal Syed Sarafudheen Thangal
 Kunjandi as Ravunninair
Idavela Babu as Nambeesan kutty
Ragini

Soundtrack

The music of the film proved successful, but the critical responses were mixed. The music was done by Bombay Ravi, while the lyrics were penned by Yusuf Ali Kechery. K. J. Yesudas, K. S. Chithra and Minmini are the vocalists. "Isal Thenkanam" and "Sangeethame Ninte" were the most popular songs from the album.

Track listing

References

External links

1990s Malayalam-language films
1993 films
Films directed by Kamal (director)
Films scored by Ravi